Paul Gregory Roshier (born 8 October 1963) is an Australian born former English cricketer.  Roshier was a right-handed batsman who bowled right-arm medium-fast.  He was born in Mount Beauty, Victoria.

Roshier made his debut for Buckinghamshire in the 1991 MCCA Knockout Trophy against Bedfordshire.  Roshier played Minor counties cricket for Buckinghamshire from 1991 to 1993, which included 12 Minor Counties Championship matches and 5 MCCA Knockout Trophy matches.  He made his List A debut for Buckinghamshire against Somerset in the 1991 NatWest Trophy.  He made two further List A appearances for the county, against Sussex in 1992 and Leicestershire in 1993.

In 1995, he appeared in a single List A match for Surrey against Young Australia.  In total, Roshier played four List A matches, scoring 35 runs and taking 3 wickets.

References

External links
Paul Roshier at ESPNcricinfo
Paul Roshier at CricketArchive

1963 births
Living people
People from Mount Beauty, Victoria
Cricketers from Victoria (Australia)
British people of Australian descent
English cricketers
Buckinghamshire cricketers
Surrey cricketers